Bojišta may refer to:
 Bojišta, Bosnia and Herzegovina
 Bojišta, Montenegro